Amrabad is a Mandal in Nagarkurnool district, Telangana It is the largest mandal in the district area-wise, but population density is less. Large portions of the mandal is occupied by Nallamala forests. Amrabad also served as the headquarters of the taluka before separate mandals were formed. It is inhabited by tribal population, mostly Chenchus.

Geography
Amrabad plateau is highly hilly region covered with dense forests and high grass. The nearest town to Amrabad is Achampet, Nagarkurnool District

Demography
According to The Imperial Gazetteer of India, Amrabad in 1901 was a taluk in Mahbubnagar district of Hyderabad State. It had an area of 727 square miles. The population was 20,880 compared with 19,601 in 1891. The headquarters Amrabad has a population of 2,267. It is situated on a Plateau, contains a large forest area and surrounded by hills.

Transportation 
The national highway from Mahbubnagar to Srisailam, Achampeta to Srisailam passes through Amrabad. Having rivers on the 3 sides, and a lack of bridges there are not adequate connectivity to other districts.

References

Mandals in Nagarkurnool district
Nagarkurnool district